"Hard for Me" is the second single by the Australian recording artist Tamara Jaber, released on 1 August 2005 by King Kyle Records.

Production and release
"Hard for Me" was written by Philippe-Marc Anquetil, Christopher Lee-Joe and Tamara Jaber, and mixed by Vince Pazzinga. It was released as a CD single on 1 August 2005, with an instrumental version alongside the original. "Hard for Me" debuted at number 34 on the ARIA Singles Chart on 8 August 2005 and peaked at number 23 on 22 August 2005. On the ARIA Dance Singles Chart, it peaked at number five.

Track listing
CD single
 "Hard for Me" – 4:00
 "Hard for Me" (Instrumental) – 3:56

Charts

Release history

References

2005 songs
2005 singles
Tamara Jaber songs